The men's 220 yards event at the 1934 British Empire Games was held on 6 and 7 August at the White City Stadium in London, England.

Medalists

Results

Heats
Held on 6 August

Qualification: First 2 in each heat (Q) qualify directly for the semifinals.

Semifinals
Held on 6 August

Qualification: First 3 in each heat (Q) qualify directly for the final.

Final
Held on 7 August

References

Athletics at the 1934 British Empire Games
1934